Turani may refer to:

People
 Anwar Yusuf Turani (born 1962), ethnic Uyghur nationalist
 Daniele Turani (1907–1964), member of the Italian Christian Democracy, and Italian Senator from Lombardy
 Muhammad Amin Khan Turani (died 1721), Grand Vizier of the Mughal Empire during the reign of the Mughal Emperor Muhammad Shah

Other
Turani, Afghanistan
Toran (Pashtun tribe)
Turani, Bosnia and Herzegovina
Turani, Iran
From the land of Turan

See also
Torani (disambiguation)